Chrysocatharylla gozmanyi is a moth in the family Crambidae. It was described by Graziano Bassi in 1999. It is found in Ghana.

References

Moths described in 1999
Endemic fauna of Ghana